Yeshivat Dvar Yerushalayim, also called the Jerusalem Academy of Jewish Studies, is a yeshiva for baalei teshuva currently located in the Har Nof neighborhood of Jerusalem. The yeshiva was founded in 1970 by Rabbi Boruch Horovitz.

Faculty
Prior to his move to Israel, Rabbi Boruch Horovitz was a rabbi in Manchester, England. Born 1930 in Frankfurt, his family and he moved to London pre-WW II. Horovitz studied in Gateshead and, in 1957, became rav of Manchester's Central Synagogue.

References

External links
 Official web site for Yeshiva Dvar Yerushalayim

Baalei teshuva institutions
Orthodox yeshivas in Jerusalem
1970 establishments in Israel
Educational institutions established in 1970